Women University of Azad Jammu and Kashmir Bagh is a public university located in Bagh, Azad Jammu & Kashmir, Pakistan.

References

Public universities and colleges in Pakistan
Women's universities and colleges in Pakistan